Amit Ben Shushan (born May 23, 1985) is an Israeli football player.

Ben Shushan can play as a striker or as a supporting forward on the wing.

He made a name for himself after his series of goals during Beitar's Intertoto campaign in 2005.

He made his debut for the Israel national football team vs Estonia on September 2, 2006, when he came in as a sub for teammate Michael Zandberg. In the next match vs Andorra he played for 90 minutes scoring his first senior goal for his country and assisting for 2 more goals. On October 7, Ben Shushan scored Israel's only goal in the away match against Russia securing a draw that could have turned vital for Israel.

Ben Shushan is part of a group of young players who helped transform Beitar Jerusalem's youth into a leading Israeli soccer academy. At the time he joined Beitar, city rival Hapoel Jerusalem was still the leading youth team in Jerusalem. Despite living less than 200 meters away from Hapoel Jerusalem's training facility in Kiryat-Hayovel, Ben Shushan opted for Beitar.

Anorthosis Famagusta
On 10 of July 2013, Shushan signed 2 years contract with yearly wages close to 140,000 euro.

References

1985 births
Living people
Israeli Jews
Israeli footballers
Israel international footballers
Beitar Jerusalem F.C. players
Anorthosis Famagusta F.C. players
Maccabi Netanya F.C. players
Hapoel Jerusalem F.C. players
Expatriate footballers in Cyprus
Israeli expatriate sportspeople in Cyprus
Israeli Premier League players
Cypriot First Division players
Footballers from Jerusalem
Israel under-21 international footballers
Israeli people of Moroccan-Jewish descent
Association football forwards